Dashu Township is a township under the administration of Dongxiang Autonomous County, Gansu, China. , it has 10 villages under its administration.

References 

Township-level divisions of Gansu
Dongxiang Autonomous County